Titu-ye Pain (also Romanized as Tītū-ye Pā’īn) is a village in Javar Rural District, in the Central District of Kuhbanan County, Kerman Province, Iran. At the 2006 census, its population was 35, in 9 families.

References 

Populated places in Kuhbanan County